Anchovia is a genus of anchovies. It currently contains 3 species.

 Anchovia clupeoides (Swainson, 1839) (Zabaleta anchovy)
 Anchovia macrolepidota (Kner, 1863) (Bigscale anchovy)
 Anchovia surinamensis (Bleeker, 1865) (Surinam anchovy)

References

 

Anchovies
Ray-finned fish genera
Taxa named by David Starr Jordan
Taxa named by Barton Warren Evermann